Bogner is a surname. Notable people with the surname include:

Norman Bogner (born 1935), American novelist
Reinhold Bogner, founder of Bogner Amplification
Sebastian Bogner (born 1991), German chess grandmaster
Tobias Bogner (born 1990), German ski jumper
Willy Bogner Sr. (1909–1977), German Nordic skier
Willy Bogner Jr. (born 1942), German fashion designer and alpine ski racer

See also
"Bogner", a 1993 song by musicians Larry Carlton and the late Terry McMillan from the Renegade Gentleman album.
Bognor (disambiguation)